Intense Tropical Cyclone Kamisy was considered the worst tropical cyclone to affect northern Madagascar since 1911. A tropical disturbance formed near Diego Garcia on April 3, 1984 and subsequently moved westward, intensifying into a moderate tropical storm two days later. Given the name Kamisy, the storm gradually intensified into an intense tropical cyclone by April 9. Kamisy reached winds of 170 km/h (105 mph) before making landfall in extreme northern Madagascar near Diego Suarez. It weakened upon entering the Mozambique Channel, but briefly re-intensified on April 10. That day while passing near Mayotte, the cyclone turned to the southeast, striking Madagascar again near Majunga. Kamisy quickly crossed the country. After emerging into the Indian Ocean off the east coast of Madagascar, the system reintensified into a moderate tropical storm before dissipating on April 16.

About 39,000 people were left homeless in the area, and there were five deaths. In western Madagascar, the cyclone dropped  of rainfall in 24 hours in Majunga, which damaged rice fields in the region after causing widespread river flooding. Additionally, the storm destroyed about 80% of Majunga. Throughout the country, Kamisy caused $250 million in damage and 68 deaths, with 215 people injured and 100,000 left homeless. Fifteen people were killed and 30 others were injured in Mahajanga. Following the storm, emergency food and medical supplies were rushed into the nation. In addition to the impact to Madagascar, one death and severe damage was reported in the Comoros Islands, where all of the banana crop was destroyed.

Meteorological history

Cyclone Kamisy originated from an area of convection that formed in early April. On April 3, the system was assigned a Dvorak rating of T2.0 and was respectively upgraded into a moderate tropical storm by the Météo-France office on Reunion (MFR). However, the storm was not classified by the Joint Typhoon Warning Center (JTWC) until that evening. The storm initially tracked west-southwest, but after briefly weakening into a tropical depression, Kamisy began to turn west.

Early on April 7, however, Kamisy was upgraded into a severe tropical storm as it had earned a rating of T4.0 on the Dvorak scale. Thereafter, the storm began to undergo rapid deepening. Meanwhile, MFR upgraded the system into cyclone intensity. After briefly leveling off in intensity, the storm attained peak intensity of  later that day. Around this time, Kamisy was assigned a T6.0 rating via the Dvorak technique.

After maintaining peak intensity for less than a day, it weakened slightly. On April 9, the storm brushed the northern Madagascar coast as a severe tropical storm, though the JTWC suggested that Kamsiy was considerably stronger. However, the afternoon to storm emerged into the extreme northern Mozambique Channel, where it passed near Mayotte, with little change in strength. After sharply turning south-southwest, Kamisy briefly regained tropical cyclone intensity, but resumed weakening as it approached the coast. While still a moderate tropical storm, it made landfall along the north-central part of the nation on April 12, near Tamative. At the time of landfall, the JTWC noted that Kamisy was a minimal hurricane. The storm quickly weakened overland and was a tropical depression by the time it had emerged into the Indian Ocean. Shortly thereafter, the storm restrengthened into a moderate tropical storm, but this trend was short-lived. The JTWC downgraded Kamisy into a tropical depression at 0600 UTC on April 14. The agency issued the last warning on the system the following day, even though MFR kept tracking the system until the morning hours of April 16.

Impact

Madagascar
Throughout Madagascar, a total of 68 casualties were reported and 100,000 people were left homeless. Damage totaled to more than $250 million (1984 USD). Kamisy was considered the worst system to strike Madagascar since 1911. According to Relief Web, 7,000 buildings were at least partially destroyed, including 1,020 schools and 450 hospitals. Approximately 215 people were injured due to the storm. Overall, Kamisy was the strongest storm to hit the nation between 1980 and 1993.

In Diego Suarez, the storm caused significant damage, especially in residential areas. Warehouses, schools, and other public buildings suffered extensive damage. Throughout the city, 80% of the buildings were damaged and the town was 85% destroyed. Electrical and water supplies were cut in Diego Suarez. Nearby, in Befaria, a leprosarium, which housed 200 patients and their families, was damaged. The small village of Mangaoka was forced to move inland . Due to the rainfall, 70% of the town's population moved to high ground. In Antsiranana, 30,000 of the 40,000 inhabitants were left homeless and were left with little food or water. Throughout northern Madagascar, about 39,000 people were left homeless in the area; there were five deaths.

After making its second landfall, 80% of the port of Mahajanga was destroyed, where 42,120 people were reportedly homeless. Many neighborhoods of the town, whose population was 45,000, were completed washed away. Many rice fields in the region were destroyed due to widespread river flooding. In Mahajanga alone, 15 people were killed while 30 others were majorly hurt. Several schools throughout the city were destroyed. Elsewhere, the town of Movoya was also mostly destroyed.

Elsewhere
After making its first landfall, the storm struck Mayotte, in the Comoros island group, where severe damage was recorded. One death was also reported. Dozens of others were severely hurt. Around 25,000 people were displaced.  All of the banana and rice crop were destroyed by the storm in both Comoros and Seychelles.

Aftermath
Following the storm, emergency food and medical supplies were rushed into the nation. Due to Madagascar's small budget, it did not have the resources to repair all the damage alone. Two French rescue mission, including one from Reunion, provided victims with food and medical assistance to Madagascar and Mayotte. Furthermore, the Malagasy Red Cross launched an appeal for blankets, clothes, tents, and medicine. The United States provided $25,000 in cash and $15,000 worth of other  items. Moreover, Italy donated $41,500 to Madagascar. Netherlands provided $65,000 worth of supplies while the nations' the League of Red Cross and Red Crescent Societies decided to send a disaster team to the devastated area. The United Kingdom provided $74,000 is cash; France provided  of medicine, and 4 tents. Additionally, the head of Minister of State, Foreign and Commonwealth Office intended to focus on the reconstruction of bridges and roads. A private consulting company was later hired to conduct a post-storm assessment; a training program was subsequently launched, which had a budget of $3.5 million. The training program lasted until the 1985–86 South-West Indian Ocean cyclone season, when Cyclone Honorinina devastated the nation.

Sailors from the US Navy's warship USS Hector, were diverted to assist in the relief effort in Diego-Suarez, between April 23 and May 1, 1984. The warship was the first American naval vessel to visit the port after Madagascar's Government banned the superpowers including France and the United States from using it during the 1970s and were awarded two Humanitarian Service Medals. Amongst other assistance provided they restored the roof and power to the ports hospital and repaired the leprosarium at Befaria, near Diego-Suarez. Two French naval vessels also supplied brought food, medicine and other emergency supplies to help with the aftermath of the cyclone.

See also

Cyclone Geralda

Notes

References

Kamisy
1984 in the Comoros
1984 in Madagascar
Kamisy
Disasters in the Comoros
Kamisy
Intense Tropical Cyclones
Kamisy